Georgi Kochov (born 10 November 1955) is a Bulgarian alpine skier. He competed in three events at the 1976 Winter Olympics.

References

1955 births
Living people
Bulgarian male alpine skiers
Olympic alpine skiers of Bulgaria
Alpine skiers at the 1976 Winter Olympics
Place of birth missing (living people)